George Wade (1673–1748) was a British military commander.

George Wade may also refer to:
 Sir George Edward Wade or George Robey (1869–1954), English comedian, singer and actor
 George Edward Wade (1853–1933), British sculptor
 George N. Wade (1893–1974), Pennsylvania politician
 George Woosung Wade (1858–1941), British cleric
 George Wade (pottery manufacturer) (1891–1986), chairman of Wade Ceramics Ltd in Britain

See also
 George N. Wade Memorial Bridge or North Bridge, a bridge across the Susquehanna River in Harrisburg, Pennsylvania